Wanit Chaisan (born 25 July 1992) is a Thai professional footballer who plays as a striker.

References

External links
 Goal.com 
 Players Profile - info.thscore.com
 

1992 births
Chaisan, Wanit
Wanit Chaisan
Wanit Chaisan
Chaisan, Wanit
Wanit Chaisan
Wanit Chaisan
Wanit Chaisan
Wanit Chaisan
Wanit Chaisan
Wanit Chaisan
Wanit Chaisan
Nakhon Si United F.C. players